Ali Ghulam Murtaza (born 1 January 1990) is an Indian first-class cricketer. He plays for Uttar Pradesh. He was a member of Indian World Team in the Indian Cricket League Twenty20 competition. He bowled well in ICL and earned a reputation as a skilled left-arm spinner. In IPL 2010, he was a part of the Mumbai Indians squad which lost to Chennai Super Kings in the final. Since he played in ICL he has a one-year period during which he cannot represent the Indian cricket team. From the 2012 edition of IPL, he played for Pune Warriors India.

His father was cricket coach at Bishop Johnson School & College, Allahabad

References

1990 births
Living people
Indian cricketers
Uttar Pradesh cricketers
Mumbai Indians cricketers
Pune Warriors India cricketers
Delhi Giants cricketers